Nathan Kiley (born 2 April 1981 in Nathan Kiely) is an English stage actor who has most notably starred in the West End production of Chicago as Mary Sunshine at the Cambridge Theatre as well as Tony Blair in Tony Blair the Musical, performed at the 2007 Edinburgh Festival.

Personal life
Nathan was raised in Boroughbridge, a small town near York, North Yorkshire, where he grew up with his twin sister Gaby. He attended St John Fisher RC High School in Harrogate where he was involved in numerous school productions before attending Durham University where he gained a 2:1 in English Literature. He undertook formal stage training at Guildford School of Acting where he graduated with a First in Musical Theatre.

Performing career

References

External links
 http://news.bbc.co.uk/1/hi/entertainment/6929133.stm
 http://tonyblairthemusical.co.uk/reviewssimple.htm
 http://www.thestage.co.uk/reviews/review.php/22810/cinderella
 http://www.reviewsgate.com/index.php?name=News&file=article&sid=3839
 http://christmas.icnetwork.co.uk/christmas-entertainment/christmas-entertainment/2009/12/18/review-cinderella-at-the-grand-theatre-wolverhampton-65233-25423490/
 http://www.musicomh.com/theatre/mikado_0708.htm
 http://www.thestage.co.uk/reviews/review.php/7135/gsa-conservatoire-ba-hons-musical-theatre

1981 births
Living people
Alumni of Durham University
Alumni of the Guildford School of Acting
English male musical theatre actors
English male stage actors
People from Boroughbridge
Male actors from Yorkshire